Richard de Mille (February 12, 1922 – April 8, 2009) was an American author.

Early life and education 
He was born in Monrovia, California, to William C. deMille and the Scottish author and screenwriter Lorna Moon, when  William C. was still married to his first wife, Anna George de Mille. His uncle, Cecil B. DeMille, adopted and raised Richard, not telling him of his true parentage until the death of his birth father when Richard was 33 years old.

He first enrolled at Columbia University with the class of 1944, later transferring to the University of California, Los Angeles before graduating.

Writing career 
He served with the United States Army Air Corps from 1943 to 1946. That year, he became a writer and director at KTLA, remaining in that position through 1950. Around this time he joined the movement that was to become Scientology leaving KTLA to become an editorial/personal assistant to founder L. Ron Hubbard. De Mille used the nom de plume "D. Folgere" (an Anglo-Saxon phrase meaning "follower") when editing and/or ghost-writing during that time, despite Hubbard's protests that it would appear "Dick de Mille wasn't a true believer". He was attracted to Hubbard because, as he later said, "I thought he was a great man who had made a great discovery, and whatever his shortcomings they must be discounted because he had the answer." On February 24, 1951, De Mille assisted Hubbard in kidnapping the latter's wife, Sara, from her apartment in Los Angeles in an unsuccessful bid to have her declared insane by a psychiatrist. They eventually released her in Yuma, Arizona. The two men had already taken Hubbard's daughter Alexis and a few days later flew together with Alexis to Havana, Cuba. In 1953, he was an associate professor at Sequoia University and taught at the Department of Scientology. It was during this time that he wrote "Introduction to Scientology" published by Scientology Council, at the time an affiliate of Sequoia University. By 1954, however, he had become disillusioned with Scientology and left the organization, explaining that he "didn't like all the contradictions and I was becoming more and more sceptical of the whole thing".

In 1955, he completed his B.A. degree at Pepperdine University and married Margaret Belgrano. He went on to get a Ph.D. from the University of Southern California in 1961. He remained with that institution as a research psychologist until 1962, when he became a lecturer in psychology at the University of California, Santa Barbara. In 1965, he left that position, becoming editorial director of the Brooks Foundation the following year. He stayed there until 1967, becoming a research psychologist at the General Research Corp. in 1968, where he remained through 1973.

He also wrote a biography of his birth mother, screenwriter Lorna Moon entitled My Secret Mother: Lorna Moon. Fellow writer Carol Easton (author of No Intermission: The Life of Agnes de Mille) remarked: "None of Richard de Mille's extraordinary relatives, not even the legendary Cecil B. de Mille himself, could have invented this riveting true story of celebrity, passion, betrayal, and tragedy".

Writings on Carlos Castaneda 

De Mille wrote Castaneda's Journey: The Power and the Allegory in 1976, a book describing the detective work through which he said that Carlos Castaneda was a hoaxer and plagiarist and that don Juan is fictional. He edited a second book on the same subject, The Don Juan Papers in 1980, when he found that his exposé did not lead Casteneda's most ardent followers to fall away.  This book contains documents representing views of Castaneda across the spectrum.

Works 

Introduction to Scientology, Scientology Council, 1953.
Children's Imagination Games, Dunbar Guidance Center, 1955.
Put Your Mother on the Ceiling: Children's Imagination Games, Walker & Co., 1967, revised edition, Viking, 1973.
(with R. P. Barthol) Project ECHO, Management Information Services, 1969.
Two Qualms and a Quark, Capra, 1973.
(as B. Grayer Dimrecken) A Skeleton Key to "The Transuxors", Capra, 1973.
Castaneda's Journey: The Power and the Allegory, Capra, 1976. , 
The Don Juan Papers: Further Castaneda Controversies, Ross-Erickson, 1980. , 
My Secret Mother: Lorna Moon, Farrar, Straus, & Giroux, 1998 , 
(with Bernard Stein) Benjamin Brief, DeMille Files & Reford Folder, 2001.

References

Further reading 
L.A. Confidential: The Author Was Raised By Cecil B. And Constance De Mille. Then He Found Out Who His Real Parents Were. Article by David Freeman. Published April 19, 1998.(c) New York Times.
The Secret of the Other de Mille. Article by Scott Eyman. Published April 29, 1998. (c) Cox News Service.
An Original: Richard de Mille. Article by Dr. Wallace Sampson. Published June 25, 2009. (c) Science-Based Medicine.
Transcription of interview with Richard DeMille, Santa Barbara, California, 25 July 1986, via David Touretzky

1922 births
2009 deaths
People from the San Gabriel Valley
American adoptees
American male journalists
Journalists from California
United States Army Air Forces personnel of World War II
American former Scientologists
United States Army Air Forces soldiers
Pepperdine University alumni
University of Southern California alumni
University of California, Santa Barbara faculty
University of Southern California faculty
Richard
Columbia College (New York) alumni
20th-century American journalists